The Emperor: Owner of the Mask is a South Korean television series starring Yoo Seung-ho, Kim So-hyun, Kim Myung-soo, Yoon So-hee, Heo Joon-ho, and Park Chul-min. It aired on MBC every Wednesday and Thursday at 22:00 (KST) from May 10 to July 13, 2017 for 40 episodes.

Plot
During the Joseon Dynasty, the long-awaited son of King Yi Yoon is born, but in exchange for its life, the king will hand over the power of the Bureau of Water Supply to the secret society "Pyunsoo Group" that controls the government.  The king covers the Crown Prince's face with a mask and raises him secretly in order to protect him from the Pyunsoo Group.

Sixteen years later, Crown Prince Yi Sun, who grew up as a respectable young man, removes his mask and left the palace secretly to go to the town to find out why he has been masked since he was born.  The purpose is to meet scholar Master Woo Bo who is the only person who knows why.

Crown Prince Lee Sun then meets high-ranking official's daughter Lady Han Ga-eun and a young man who has the same name as himself, Lee Sun, and deepens friendship with them.

After some time, the secret society Pyunsoo Group assassinates King Yi Yoon but Crown Prince Yi Sun escaped. The Pyunsoo Group put a fake king on the throne and controls this king and the whole Imperial Court by using a suspicious drug with poisonous properties. Having witnessed the people's suffering, the Crown Prince decides to devote himself to fight the Pyunsoo Group and reclaim his throne.

Cast

Main
 Yoo Seung-ho as Crown Prince Yi Sun 
The real Crown Prince of Joseon and also known as the Chief Peddler.
 Kim So-hyun as Lady Han Ga-eun 
Daughter of Deputy Magistrate Han, one of the students of Master Woo Bo and childhood friend of commoner Yi Sun. She has wide knowledge of medicinal herbs.
 Kim Myung-soo as Commoner Yi-sun 
Initially worked as a water deliverer at the Bureau of Water Supply, student of Master Woo Bo and a childhood friend of Lady Ga Eun. He was planted as a fake king by Pyeon-soo group and this slowly gave birth to his greed and desire to become the true king of Joseon in order to earn Ga-eun's feelings, as partially driven by his jealousy towards Crown Prince Yi Sun and the manipulation of Kim Dae-mok.
 Yoon So-hee as Kim Hwa-gun 
Granddaughter of Pyunsoo Group leader Dae-mok and head of all the merchants in Joseon. She fell in love with the Crown Prince at first sight. And, remained loyal towards the Crown Prince till the end.
 Heo Joon-ho as Kim Dae-mok 
Head of the secret society “Pyunsoo Group.” He controls King Yi Yoon and the imperial court by using a mysterious drug with poisonous properties. He forgives no one when they betray Pyunsoo Group, and he even went as far as to murder his own granddaughter for betraying him and showing loyalty to the Crown Prince.
 Park Chul-min as Master Woo-bo 
A scholar in medicine and well-versed in Western knowledge.

Supporting

 Kim Byung-chul as Kim Woo-jae. He is the only son of Dae-mok and also the leader of Pyungsoohwe group. He is the father of Hwa-gun. He is foolish and often despised by his father Dae-mok, but he is very caring towards his daughter.
 Kim Jong-soo as Joo Jin-myung
 Do Yong-goo as Choi Sung-gi
 Jung Kyu-soo as Heo Yoo-gun
 Kim Young-woong as Jo Tae-ho. The head of Water Bureau.
 Kim Seo-kyung as Gon, the loyal bodyguard of Lady Hwa-gun. Later, it was revealed that he was in love with his Lady, Hwa-gun. Out of love for Hwa-gun, he granted her last wish before her death by switching his allegiance to the Crown Prince and protects him from Dae-mok.
 Park Ki-ryung as Mr. Jang
 Lee Ki-young 
 Um Hyo-sup 

People around Crown Prince Yi Sun

 Shin Hyun-soo as Yi Chung-woon, Crown Prince Lee Sun's loyal personal bodyguard. He is the son of the dead king Yi Yoon's personal bodyguard, Bum Woo. Crown Prince Yi Sun and Chung woon grew up together.
 Bae Yoo-ram as Park Moo-ha, adjunct official who was arrested together with Deputy Magistrate Han. He was loyal towards the Crown Prince till the very end.
 Lee Chae-young as Mae-chang, a court lady who disguises as a gisaeng. Joseon's expert on poetry and an experienced gayageum player. Initially, she was a lady of mysterious origin and identity. But, later it reveals that she is the daughter of the head eunuch and she tries to help the Crown Prince, but her father forbids her to. She used to work on Pyungsoohwe field of poisons at an early age, but she escaped.

Family of commoner Yi-sun

 Park Hyun-suk as Yoo Sun-daek, commoner Yi-sun's mother.
 Jung Hae-kyun as commoner Yi-sun's father
 Go Na-hee as Kko-mool, commoner Yi-sun's younger sister

Royal palace

 Kim Myung-soo (1966) as King Yi Yoon, Crown Prince Yi Sun's father. He wanted to become the king and thus his greed made him to become a part of Pyungsoo group. He assassinated his father and became the king. 
 Kim Sun-kyung as the Queen, Crown Prince Yi Sun's legal mother (Royal Mother). She was the one to poison the Crown Prince.
 Choi Ji-na as Lady Yi Young-bin, Crown Prince Yi Sun's biological mother
 Jung Doo-hong as Yi Bum-woo. He was the personal and loyal bodyguard as well as a childhood friend of the old king, Yi Yoon.
 Song In-guk as Hyun-suk. Initially it is seen, that he is a loyal friend and bodyguard of the fake king Commoner Yi Sun. But later, it was revealed that he was a lackey of Dae-mok.
 Jung Ah-mi as Court Lady Han. She was forever loyal towards the Royal Mother.
 Lee Dae-ro as Chief Eunuch. He is the father of Ma Chaeng. He is neither for the late king nor for the Crown Prince nor for Dae-mok. He was supposedly loyal towards Crown Prince's grandfather/late king's father.

Extended

 Jeon No-min as Deputy Magistrate Han Kyu-ho, father of Lady Ga Eun. He was a kind and righteous official who was later being executed due to the manipulation of Pyeon-soo group.
 Jin Ki-joo as Choi Kang-seo
 Gong Jung-hwan
 Min Pil-joon as Park Cheon-soo

Production
Despite differences in tone, the media noted the drama's similarities with KBS2's hit series Love in the Moonlight (2016) as both are set in Joseon era with young lead actors born in 1993 (Moonlight's Park Bo-gum, Emperor's Yoo Seung-ho) and 1999 (Moonlight's Kim Yoo-jung, Emperor's Kim So-hyun). Emperor also co-stars Park Chul-min who had a supporting role in Moonlight. Interestingly, Park Chul-min portrays an antagonist and corrupt official in Moonlight, but in contrast, he plays a righteous man who was a trusted ally of the protagonist Crown Prince Yi Sun in Emperor.
The first script reading took place on December 23, 2016 at MBC Broadcasting Station in Sangam, Seoul, South Korea. The series was pre-produced with filming commencing in December 2016, and lasted six months. The series reunited Kim So-hyun and Yoo Seung-ho who starred in Missing You (2013), and Kim Myung-soo and Yoon So-hee in The Day After We Broke Up (2016).
The series was promoted heavily by MBC, with the first teaser released six months before its premiere at the MBC Drama Awards, where leads Yoo and Kim also served as presenters. There were also several exclusive Naver features and V Live broadcasts before and during its run.

Original soundtrack

Part 1

Part 2

Part 3

Part 4

Part 5

Part 6

Part 7

Part 8

Part 9

Part 10

Part 11

Part 12

Part 13

Part 14

Part 15

Part 16

Part 17

Part 18

Chart performance

Reception
Despite being touted as "the next Love in the Moonlight" which became a "youth sageuk sensation", The Emperor: Owner of the Mask failed to emulate the success of Love in the Moonlight and only averaged modest ratings of 12.4%.  Additionally, even though it topped ratings in its time slot, it was overtaken by its competitor in the important 20-49 year old demographic, as well as streaming, popularity, and brand reputation charts for consecutive weeks. With the extensive promotion and hype the series received before premiere, its figures were underwhelming. Performances of the cast were praised, though audiences also stated their dissatisfaction with the story and the production as a whole. William Schwartz of HanCinema stated that the series is "irredeemably stupid", adding that "...the obstacles the characters run into are never clearly defined. It's one of the reasons why the resolutions in this drama are so unsatisfying. There's no tension."

Ratings
In the table below, the blue numbers represent the lowest ratings and the red numbers represent the highest ratings.

Awards and nominations

Notes

References

External links
  
 
 

South Korean historical television series
Television series set in the Joseon dynasty
MBC TV television dramas
2017 South Korean television series debuts
2017 South Korean television series endings
Television series by Studio Santa Claus Entertainment
South Korean pre-produced television series